Aristotle Athari (born July 28, 1991) is an American comedian, actor, and filmmaker. Athari is best known for his brief tenure as a cast member on the NBC sketch comedy series Saturday Night Live during its 47th season between 2021 and 2022.

Career 
Athari is of Iranian American descent.

After starting his career in stand-up comedy, Athari began collaborating with Muslim-American comedians Hasan Minhaj, Asif Ali, and Fahim Anwar on sketches under the group name Goatface. An hour-long special of their sketch work aired on Comedy Central in 2018. He had a recurring role on the final two seasons of HBO's Silicon Valley as Gabe. Athari also cohosts the improvised podcast "This Is Americans Live," a parody of the radio show This American Life.

In 2021, Athari was cast as a featured player on Saturday Night Live, alongside fellow newcomers James Austin Johnson and Sarah Sherman, for its forty-seventh season. He was the first Middle-Eastern male on the show and the second cast member of Iranian descent in the show's history (following Nasim Pedrad). He did not return for the 48th season of SNL.

Personal life 
Athari married photographer Maura Grace in September 2021.

Filmography

Film

Television

References

External links
 

1991 births
Living people
21st-century American comedians
American comedians of Iranian descent
American male comedians
American male television actors
American sketch comedians
American stand-up comedians
Comedians from Texas
People from Plano, Texas